USS Monocacy was one of two shallow draft gunboats designed for service on the upper Yangtze River over  inland. It was pre-constructed at Mare Island Navy Yard in 1912 and then dismantled and shipped to Shanghai, China. She was laid down by the Shanghai Dock & Engineering Co. 28 April 1913. One year later, or 27 April 1914 she was launched, sponsored by Mrs. Andrew E. Carter, and commissioned 24 June 1914.

Service history
Assigned to the 2nd Division, Asiatic Fleet (formalized as the Yangtze Patrol in 1922), Monocacy sailed upriver from Shanghai on 29 June 1914 to cruise between Ichang and Chungking. For the next 15 years, but for annual visits to Shanghai for overhaul, the gunboat patrolled the upper Yangtze with Chungking her upriver base. Monocacy protected American interests in treaty ports down the entire length of the Yangtze, at times escorting vessels, evacuating American citizens during periods of disturbance, and, in general, assisting U.S. Consulates in various Chinese cities.

The annual springtime trip down the Yangtze for overhaul at Shanghai was timed to coincide with rising water through the Three Gorges. A sailor reaching the entertainments of Shanghai with six months' pay in his pockets from the time patrolling upriver claimed to use most of his money for liquor and women, and spend the rest foolishly.

One crewman was killed and two others were wounded in the short but fierce fight. In June 1920, she was reclassified as PG-20 and a month later she engaged in another battle. Three years later, in February and March 1923, the gunboat operated against bandits holding up American missionaries and firing upon U.S. flag vessels above Kiangnang, rescuing the Syracuse Medical Unit and a number of American families. Later that year, she protected U.S. river commerce from warlord armies and then in August, she established friendly relations with the Governor of Kiangsin Province.

Monocacy continued her patrol operations on the upper Yangtze, reclassified PR‑2 on 15 June 1928. She was placed in reserve 24 June 1929. Based at Shanghai, the gunboat cruised the lower river, making less frequent voyages to her original patrol area between Chungking and Ichang. She was placed in full commission once again 19 September 1931 to join other American naval vessels on the river in assisting the many Chinese forced from their homes by August floods which had inundated  of land during the worst disaster in the river's history. In 1933, Monocacy began to serve as station ship in various treaty ports during the cruising season, with her crew serving as a landing force in case of trouble.

Monocacy was at Kiuklang protecting American neutrality during the Japanese invasion of China, when on 29 August 1938 several mines exploded within  of the ship, showering the gunboat with fragments. She was then held at the port until the Japanese completed sweeping operations some days later. She was decommissioned at Shanghai on 31 January 1939. The veteran gunboat was towed to sea and sunk 10 February 1939 in deep water off the China coast.

References

External links
Photo gallery at navsource.org

Gunboats of the United States Navy
Ships built in China
Ships built in Vallejo, California
1914 ships
Riverine warfare
Maritime incidents in 1920
Maritime incidents in 1939
Scuttled vessels
Shipwrecks of China